Spider-Man/Black Cat: The Evil That Men Do is a six-issue comic book limited series published by Marvel Comics starring the superhero Spider-Man and his ally, the cat burglar known as the Black Cat.
The title of the book is an allusion to William Shakespeare's Julius Caesar. In the play, Mark Antony says, with regards to Caesar: "The evil that men do lives after them; The good is often interred with their bones".

Publication history
Writer/director Kevin Smith began writing the Spider-Man/Black Cat: The Evil That Men Do limited series in 2002. Smith was originally going to take over writing Amazing Spider-Man after the completion of the mini-series, which would serve as a lead-in. After the third issue, the series went on an unplanned hiatus until 2005, when Smith revealed he had finally finished writing the scripts. When the limited series resumed, the last three issues were titled just as Spider-Man/Black Cat in the comic's legal indicia printed on the inside title page. Smith has stated: "While I have zero defense for my lateness (particularly when folks like Bendis turn out great stories in multiple books on a monthly basis), I will say this: It's a much better story now than it would've been had I completed it back in '02."

Smith was heavily criticized for his lateness. However, in January 2006 Smith revealed that due to his own failure to submit the relevant paperwork, Marvel's then-newly computerized system for paying writers for their scripts had not created the relevant check. Smith did not discover this until after completing the series, and so did not in fact receive any payment at all for his work until it had been finished; in his own words, "Justice, in some weird manner, has been served, I guess".

Story summary 
The Black Cat, the former lover of Spider-Man, returns to New York City.

"What's New Pussy Cat?"
Spider-Man is looking for a missing woman named Tricia and investigating the death of Donald Phillips, an honor roll student who died from a heroin overdose, despite a lack of evidence that he had ever used heroin. Spider-Man confronts a drug dealer, and learns of Mr. Brownstone (a name that is itself a slang term for heroin), who is rumored to molest teenaged boys, and a lackey, Hunter Todd.

The Black Cat, also looking for Tricia, meets up with Spider-Man. The two confront Hunter, whose girlfriend dies of a drug overdose. At the same moment, Mr. Brownstone is revealed as a concert violinist named Garrison Klum.

"A Ruse by Any Other Name..." 
Klum turns off a cell phone and enters a stage at Carnegie Hall. Spider-Man and Black Cat crash a party being held there as they confront and defeat the villain 'Scorpia'. While Klum mugs for the camera, Spider-Man begins to suspect he is Mr. Brownstone. A man named 'Pavan' is revealed to be working for Spider-Man.

"Hate Crimes" 
Spider-Man and Black Cat learn that Scorpia was hired by Alberto Ortega, the head of a local drug syndicate, to assassinate Klum. Klum kills the Ortega gang via heroin overdoses. Black Cat leaves Spider-Man after a disagreement on how to handle the case. When she confronts Klum herself, it is revealed that he is a mutant as he uses his powers to teleport a small quantity of heroin directly into her heart. He then starts cutting open her costume with the intention of raping her.

"A Study in Scarlet" 
Felicia Hardy waits in prison at Riker's Island, accused of Klum's murder. Matt Murdock, also known as Daredevil, tries to convince Felicia to undergo a rape kit; if she had been raped, Klum's death would be ruled as self-defense but Felicia denies being raped. Spider-Man and Daredevil decide to break Felicia out of prison; but Francis Klum, Garrison Klum's lackey and younger brother as well as a low-level psychic and teleporter, has already done so. He forces Daredevil and Spider-Man to fight, then teleports away with Felicia, leaving Daredevil and Spider-Man dazed.

"Trickle Down" 
Spider-Man and Daredevil decide to contact Nightcrawler of the X-Men to consult him about Klum's potential nature as a mutant, since he possesses similar teleportation powers. Francis, elsewhere, explains his past to Felicia. Over the years, Francis was sexually abused by his older brother, who used him and his own talents to gain power. Garrison's main focus was to deliver drugs into his client, who paid heavily for no needle tracks. Francis had killed Garrison by teleporting inside his body and blowing him up out from the inside out in order to save Felicia. In attempting to persuade Francis to turn himself in, Felicia reveals she too had once been raped.

"One in Four" 
Flashbacks reveal that Felicia was raped by her boyfriend, Ryan, as a freshman at Empire State University. She did not report the rape, not wanting to become "just another statistic" and trained in fighting techniques, intent on revenge on her attacker. Ryan died in a car accident before she could do anything, however. The story nearly convinces Francis, but Spider-Man and Daredevil show up at an inopportune moment, and a fight erupts. Francis falls from a great height but teleports away before hitting the water. Later, a disfigured Francis swears his revenge on Spider-Man as well as Black Cat, enlisting the aid of The Kingpin, who sells him the suit formerly worn by Mysterio.

Collected editions
The series has been collected into a single volume:

Spider-Man/Black Cat: The Evil That Men Do (176 pages, hardcover, May 2006, softcover, May 2007)

References

External links
Spider-Man/Black Cat: The Evil That Men Do reviews @ spiderfan.org 
Spider-Man/Blackcat: The Evil That Men Do @ Marvel.fandom.com

2002 comics debuts
2006 comics endings
Comics by Kevin Smith
Spider-Man titles
Team-up comics